Mesocrambus tamsi is a species of moth in the family Crambidae described by Stanisław Błeszyński in 1960. It is found on Sardinia and in North Africa (including Morocco and Algeria) and Syria.

References

Moths described in 1960
Crambinae
Moths of Europe